Richard Gottehrer (born 1940) is an American songwriter, record producer and record label executive. In 1997, he co-founded the Orchard with longtime business partner Scott Cohen, an independent music distribution company.

His career began as a Brill Building songwriter in the 1960s. His first number one record as a songwriter and producer was "My Boyfriend's Back" by the Angels, followed by other hits like "Hang On Sloopy" by the McCoys and "I Want Candy" by the Strangeloves, of which the latter Gottehrer was a member. In 1966, he formed Sire Records with Seymour Stein, which played a crucial role in the rise of new wave, and went on to launch the careers of Blondie, Madonna, Ramones and Talking Heads. His career continued as producer for the Go-Go's' 1981 debut album, Dr. Feelgood, Richard Hell, the Bongos and Moonpools & Caterpillars' first release with a major label, 1995's Lucky Dumpling. In 2013, the Orchard was described as "the biggest digital music distributor on the planet".

Personal life
Gottehrer was born in the Bronx, New York, United States. Gottehrer graduated from Taft High School. He pursued a B.A. in history at Adelphi University, spent one year at Brooklyn Law School, then pursued a career in the music industry. Gottehrer is Jewish.

Career
Gottehrer came to prominence as a songwriter in the 1960s. His more notable songs are "My Boyfriend's Back" and "I Want Candy". As Feldman-Goldstein-Gottehrer (FGG Productions), he wrote various songs with Jerry Goldstein and Bob Feldman, including "Sorrow", also by the McCoys, later covered by David Bowie on his Pin Ups album. In 1964, Feldman, Goldstein and Gottehrer created an allegedly Australian beat group called the Strangeloves. In 1966, Gottehrer founded Sire Records with Seymour Stein.

By the 1970s, he had progressed to record production, and was responsible for the debut albums by Blondie and the Go-Go's. Among the other artists produced by Gottehrer were Marshall Crenshaw, Richard Hell and the Voidoids, Joan Armatrading, the Fleshtones, the Bongos, Richard Barone, Mental as Anything, Robert Gordon, Link Wray, Dr. Feelgood and short-lived, electro-punk outfit Chiefs of Relief. In 1997, Gottehrer founded the Orchard, a digital music distribution company.

In 2010, he produced Dum Dum Girls' debut album I Will Be, and continued producing them until the band broke up. He also joined the 9th annual Independent Music Awards judging panel to assist independent musicians' careers.

On May 5, 2014, Gottehrer received SESAC's Visionary Award at the 2014 Pop Music Awards for over 50 years of achievement in the music industry.

Awards
 SESAC "Visionary Award" – May 5, 2014

References

External links
 The Orchard
 WFMU in-depth interview by Michael Shelley
 Interview, HitQuarters Nov 2000
 Shallow Rewards No. 18 The Real McCoy: On Richard Gottehrer

1940 births
Living people
Record producers from New York (state)
Songwriters from New York (state)
American male songwriters
Jewish American musicians
21st-century American Jews
Adelphi University alumni